Baron István Andrássy de Csíkszentkirály et Krasznahorka (16th century – 17th century) was a Hungarian author and nobleman. He was a member of the old aristocrat Andrássy family.

His work is mentioned in the catalog of the library of Sigismund Rákóczi, Prince of Transylvania: Stephani Andrássy triplex Philosophia. The book itself did not survive.

External links
 Szinnyei, József: Magyar írók élete és munkái I. (Aachs–Bzenszki). Budapest: Hornyánszky. 1891. (Online

16th-century Hungarian people
17th-century Hungarian people
Hungarian nobility
Istvan
16th-century Hungarian writers
17th-century Hungarian writers